Events in the year 1896 in Iceland.

Incumbents 

 Monarch: Christian IX
 Minister for Iceland: Johannes Nellemann (until 13 June); Nicolai Reimer Rump onwards

Events 

 Dagskrá – Reykjavík, Icelands first newspaper begins publication.

References 

 
1890s in Iceland
Years of the 19th century in Iceland
Iceland
Iceland